Baqeleh-ye Olya (also Romanized as Bāqeleh-ye ‘Olyā; also known as Bāghleh-ye Bālā, Bāghleh-ye ‘Olyā, Bāqeleh-ye Bālā, and Gāgheleh-ye Bālā) is a village in Kivanat Rural District, Kolyai District, Sonqor County, Kermanshah Province, Iran. At the 2006 census, its population was 118, in 22 families.

References 

Populated places in Sonqor County